Gerontophilia is a 2013 Canadian romantic comedy-drama film directed by Bruce LaBruce and written by LaBruce and Daniel Allen Cox. The film had its world premiere in the Venice Days section at the 70th Venice International Film Festival on August 28, 2013, and was screened in the Vanguard section at the 2013 Toronto International Film Festival.

Described as a gay Harold and Maude, the film follows Lake, a young man who takes a job in a nursing home and develops a romantic and sexual attraction to Mr. Peabody, an elderly resident in the facility. Unlike most of LaBruce's earlier films, Gerontophilia is not sexually explicit; instead, LaBruce chose to adapt his traditional themes of sexual taboo into a film more palatable to a mainstream audience.

Synopsis
Lake is an 18-year-old college student who discovers that he has a romantic attraction to elderly men even though he is already in a relationship with his girlfriend Désirée. One day, he applies for a nursing job at a retirement home, where he meets a resident named Mr. Peabody, and the two of them become close friends. After a while, the two men develop a romantic and sexual relationship. After noticing that the residents are being overdosed on their medication by the employees, Lake decides to take Peabody off his daily medication and help him escape to a better place. This results in the two of them taking a cross-country road trip together that deepens their bond.

Cast
 Walter Borden as Mr. Peabody
 Pier-Gabriel Lajoie as Lake
 Marie-Hélène Thibault as Marie
 Katie Boland as Désirée
 Yardly Kavanagh as Nurse Baptiste
 Shawn Campbell as Bradley Nelson
 Jean-Alexandre Létourneau as Kevin
 Dana Wright as Dina
 Brian D. Wright as Mr. Guerrero

Production
Bruce LaBruce intended to give Gerontophilia a 1970s atmosphere by shooting the film with an ARRI Alexa whilst using some Zeiss prime lenses from the era.

The film received funding from both Telefilm Canada and SODEC, as well as a crowdfunding campaign on Indiegogo.

Reception
On Rotten Tomatoes, the film received a 48% approval rating, based on 27 reviews, with an average rating of 5.8/10. The website's consensus reads, "Gerontophilias handful of intriguing ideas are let down by tame execution and unconvincing acting that make the movie's premise feel creepy rather than original."

Dave Croyle of Gay Essential called the film a "captivating story of love, loss, and personal exploration."

Rakesh Ramchurn of The Independent commented, "It is rare that I would salute a predominantly underground director's move towards mainstream filmmaking, but by toning down the sex and nudity of his previous works, LaBruce has made a film that I hope will be enjoyed by wide audiences in the months to come."

References

External links
 
 
 
 
 

2013 films
2013 LGBT-related films
2013 romantic comedy-drama films
2010s coming-of-age comedy-drama films
2010s English-language films
2010s French-language films
Canadian coming-of-age comedy-drama films
Canadian LGBT-related films
Canadian romantic comedy-drama films
Coming-of-age romance films
Crowdfunded films
English-language Canadian films
Films about interracial romance
Films about old age
Films directed by Bruce LaBruce
Films shot in Montreal
Gay-related films
Indiegogo projects
LGBT-related coming-of-age films
LGBT-related romantic comedy-drama films
Sexuality and age in fiction
2010s Canadian films